Snappy Dance Theater (founded 1996) is a non-profit postmodern dance company located in Cambridge, Massachusetts, US. It was founded by current artistic director Martha Mason, Marjorie Morgan and George Whiteside.

The Company
The company is currently composed of Mason, Carey Foster, Roger Fernandes, Jeremy Towle, Lee Walden, Bonnie Duncan, and Tim Gallagher.  Alumni include Cathy Calhoun Bosch, Sean Kilbridge, Jim Banta, James Tanabe, Eveline Mostovoy, Lucy Bunning, and Bess Whitesel. It is notable for integrating non-traditional dance forms (i.e. circus performance, martial arts, puppetry)  with more traditional ones. It was part of the 2003–2004 Bank of America Celebrity Series, and has performed as part of the Open Look Festival in Saint Petersburg, Russia.

Awards
 2004 Boston Phoenix readers poll: Best Contemporary Dance Company

See also
20th century concert dance

External links
 
 Dance Magazine review

Dance companies in the United States
Dance in Massachusetts
Contemporary dance companies
1996 establishments in Massachusetts